Accident Analysis & Prevention is a bimonthly peer-reviewed public health journal covering accident prevention published by Elsevier on behalf of the Association for the Advancement of Automotive Medicine.

The journal was established in 1969 by Frank Haight (University of California, Irvine). Haight served as editor-in-chief until 2004 when Karl Kim and Rune Elvik became co-editors-in-chief. In 2013, Mohamed Abdel-Aty (University of Central Florida) took over until the end of 2020. He was succeeded in January 2021 by Helai Huang (Central South University).

According to the Journal Citation Reports, the journal has a 2020 impact factor of 4.993.

References

External links

Public health journals
Bimonthly journals
Elsevier academic journals
Publications established in 1969
English-language journals
Academic journals associated with learned and professional societies
Injury prevention journals
Transportation journals